Andrea Koppel (born November 27, 1963) is an American communications strategist, and a former TV journalist.

Early life and education
Koppel was born in New York City, the daughter of Ted Koppel, a television journalist, and Grace Anne Dorney Koppel, an attorney and spokesperson for Chronic obstructive pulmonary disease (COPD). Her father is Jewish and her mother is Catholic.

She attended Stone Ridge School of the Sacred Heart and earned a bachelor's degree in political science with a concentration in Chinese language and Asian studies from Middlebury College. She is fluent in Mandarin Chinese.

Career
Koppel was a Congressional correspondent for CNN. She served as the network's State Department correspondent from 1998 until March 2006.  Koppel joined CNN in 1993 as the network's Tokyo correspondent and in 1995 became CNN's Beijing Bureau Chief.

In February 2008, it was reported that she had joined M+R Strategic Services, a Washington, DC-based public relations firm as chief of its Communications Division.

As of 2010, Koppel was the Director of International Communications for the Red Cross
and a director of the Henry L. Stimson Center.

In June 2011, Andrea joined Mercy Corps as its Vice President of Global Engagement and Policy, leading policy and advocacy strategies, and engaging the public on issues that affect Mercy Corps’ programs and beneficiaries.

Personal life
Koppel is married to Kenneth Pollack, an intelligence and Middle East analyst.

References

External links
M+R Strategic Services web site
andrea-koppel at the stimson
NPR interviews Andrea Koppel about Haiti Earth quake

1963 births
Living people
Schools of the Sacred Heart alumni
Middlebury College alumni
American television reporters and correspondents
CNN people
Jewish American journalists
American people of German-Jewish descent
American people of British descent
The Stimson Center
21st-century American Jews